Army & Navy or Army and Navy may refer to:

Army & Navy Stores (Canada), a department store in Vancouver and department store group in Canada
Army & Navy Stores (United Kingdom), a department store in Victoria, London and department store group in the United Kingdom
Army & Navy sweets, a type of British boiled sweet
Army and Navy Club, London
Army and Navy Club (Washington, D.C.)
Manila Army and Navy Club, Philippines

See also
 Army–Navy Game, an American college football rivalry game
 Army Navy Match, an annual British rugby union match
 Army-navy store, a type of military surplus store in the United States